Mesophleps gigantella is a moth of the family Gelechiidae. It is found in Kenya and Uganda.

The wingspan is 16–26 mm. The forewings are greyish white to yellowish brown, with scattered dark scales, especially on the dorsum.

Etymology
The species name is derived from Latin giganteus (meaning gigantic) and the postfix -ellus and 
refers to this being the largest species in the genus Mesophleps.

References

Moths described in 2012
Mesophleps